Nicolás Rey y Redondo (February 1, 1834, Burgos - September 5, 1917, San Cristóbal de La Laguna, Tenerife) was a Spanish ecclesiastic, fifth Bishop of the Roman Catholic Diocese of San Cristóbal de La Laguna.

Episcopate 
Nicolás took possession as bishop of Tenerife by Royal Decree of February 5, 1894 of Queen Victoria Eugenie of Battenberg, although this appointment had to be confirmed by Pope Leo XIII, who confirmed it on May 21 of that same year. King and Redondo received the episcopal consecration on September 8 of that year and on November 9 he arrived in the diocese.

He was the promoter of the construction of the new Cathedral of San Cristóbal de La Laguna, which was consecrated on September 6, 1913. In total he ordained 44 diocesan priests. He died in San Cristóbal de La Laguna on September 5, 1917 and was buried in the Chapel of the Immaculate Conception of the Cathedral of La Laguna.

Notes

External links 
 Personal file in Catholic hierarchy.

1834 births
1917 deaths
Roman Catholic bishops of San Cristóbal de La Laguna
20th-century Roman Catholic bishops in Spain